Viktor Viktorovich Bukiyevsky (born 15 June 1979) is a former Russian professional footballer. He made his debut in the Russian Premier League in 2000 for FC Saturn Ramenskoye.

Personal life
His younger brother Pyotr Bukiyevsky was also a footballer. His father, also named Viktor Bukiyevsky, played for FC Spartak Moscow.

References

1979 births
Living people
Russian footballers
FC Saturn Ramenskoye players
Russian Premier League players
FC Oryol players
People from Kostroma
FC Arsenal Tula players
FC Zvezda Irkutsk players
Association football defenders
FC Spartak Moscow players
FC Avangard Kursk players
FC Novokuznetsk players
Sportspeople from Kostroma Oblast
FC Spartak-2 Moscow players
FC Nosta Novotroitsk players